Minnesota State Highway 70 (MN 70) is a  highway in east-central Minnesota, which runs from its         
intersection with State Highway 65 in Brunswick and continues east to its eastern terminus at the Wisconsin state line (near Grantsburg, WI), where it becomes Wisconsin Highway 70 upon crossing the St. Croix River.

Route description
Highway 70 serves as an east–west route between Mora, Brunswick, Rock Creek, and Grantsburg, WI.

The route has an interchange with Interstate 35 at the city of Rock Creek.

Highway 70 in Minnesota is a narrow roadway.  The connecting route in Wisconsin, Wisconsin Highway 70, is a wide roadway with large shoulders.  Highway 70 in Minnesota carries a great amount of recreational traffic to Wisconsin, as Twin Cities residents try to avoid nearby U.S. Highway 8, which is often a traffic congested route.

History
The route in Minnesota was numbered to correspond with Wisconsin Highway 70.

Minnesota 70 was authorized east of State Highway 107 (at Grasston / Braham) to the Wisconsin state line in 1933.

The portion of Highway 70 between State Highway 65 (at Brunswick) and State Highway 107 (at Grasston) was part of the original route of Highway 65 until  when the current short-cut of Highway 65 was built.

Highway 70 in Minnesota was completely paved c. 1949.

Major intersections

References

070
Transportation in Kanabec County, Minnesota
Transportation in Pine County, Minnesota